Mohegan Hill is a mountain in the Central New York Region of New York. It is located in the Town of Springfield, southeast of the Village of Richfield Springs and west of Allen Lake. Waiontha Mountain is located northeast of Mohegan Hill.

References

Mountains of Otsego County, New York
Mountains of New York (state)